Miss World Guam is a national pageant that sends representatives to Miss World Pageant.

History
Miss World Guam was founded in 2011. A separate pageant was launched in 2011 to focus on Miss World only and not other international pageants. On occasion, when the winner does not qualify (due to age) for either contest, a runner-up is sent. 

Guam was debuted at Miss World in 1971 and represented by Deborah Bordallo Nelson, who placed as the 4th Runner-up. Guam won the crown after the official winner of Miss World 1980, Gabriella Brum, resigned the title. Kimberly Santos became the new Miss World 1980 from Guam.

Titleholders
Color key

Guam
Beauty pageants in Guam
Guamanian awards
2011 establishments in Guam